The 1967 Akron Zips football team represented Akron University in the 1967 NCAA College Division football season as an independent. Led by seventh-year head coach Gordon K. Larson, the Zips played their home games at the Rubber Bowl in Akron, Ohio. They finished the season with a record of 4–4–1 and outscored their opponents 162–155.

Schedule

References

Akron
Akron Zips football seasons
Akron Zips football